APEX (altitude physiology expeditions) is a high altitude medical research charity. It is based in Edinburgh, Scotland and was founded in 2000. It has conducted six high altitude research expeditions to Bolivia and Kilimanjaro. 

Previous expeditions have travelled to Chacaltaya, Bolivia. The next expedition, APEX 6, will take place at Huayna Potosi, Bolivia in June 2021. The expedition aims to research the physiology of high altitude pulmonary edema (HAPE), the effects of high altitude on menstrual bleeding, cognition and sleep.

Apex administers the International HAPE database, a research registry for individuals who are susceptible to high altitude pulmonary edema (HAPE) or high altitude cerebral edema (HACE).

External links
The charity's official website
Mountain sickness research
High altitude pulmonary edema research

Health charities in Scotland
Medical research institutes in the United Kingdom
Research institutes in Edinburgh
2000 establishments in Scotland
Educational institutions established in 2000